Marisela Morales may refer to:

 Marisela Morales, Mexican neuroscientist
 Marisela Morales (born 1970), Mexican lawyer